Carl Klaus (born 16 January 1994) is a German professional footballer who plays as a goalkeeper for 1. FC Nürnberg.

References

External links

1994 births
Living people
Footballers from Stuttgart
German footballers
Association football goalkeepers
3. Liga players
VfL Wolfsburg II players
Stuttgarter Kickers players
Segunda División B players
CD Atlético Baleares footballers
SV Darmstadt 98 players
1. FC Nürnberg players
Germany youth international footballers
German expatriate footballers
German expatriate sportspeople in Spain
Expatriate footballers in Spain